Defending champion Rafael Nadal defeated Roger Federer in the final, 6–1, 6–3 to win the men's singles tennis title at the 2013 Italian Open. It was his record-extending seventh Italian Open title.

Seeds
The top eight seeds receive a bye into the second round :

Draw

Finals

Top half

Section 1

Section 2

Bottom half

Section 3

Section 4

Qualifying

Seeds

Qualifiers

Lucky losers
  Lukáš Rosol

Qualifying draw

First qualifier

Second qualifier

Third qualifier

Fourth qualifier

Fifth qualifier

Sixth qualifier

Seventh qualifier

References

Main Draw
Qualifying Draw

Men's Singles
Italian Open - Singles